Caroline Dowdeswell (born 7 March 1945, Oldham, Lancashire) is a former English television actress.

Career
She attended theatre school from age 12 and joined the Bromley Rep at 17. Dowdeswell first appeared on television in 1961, and her first role was in The Villains in 1964. Her television career includes appearances in Crossroads; Softly, Softly; Z-Cars; Our's Is A Nice House; Dad's Army in the recurring role of Janet King; On The Buses; Casanova and Man About The House. She also played Sandra in the films On the Buses and Mutiny on the Buses. She retired from acting in 1978 and now works in the publishing industry.

Acting Credits 
1964: The Villains - The Blonde - 1 episode
1966: You Can’t Win - Cynthia Atkinson - 1 episode 
1966: North and South - Edith Shaw - 2 episodes 
1966: Meet the Wife - Saleslady - 1 episode 
1966: Vendetta - WPC69 - 1 episode 
1967: United! - Millicent Henbro - 1 episode 
1967: ITV Play of the Week - Mollie - 1 episode 
1967: Softly, Softly - June - 2 episodes 
1968: Z-Cars - Mary Carson - 2 episodes 
1968: Champion House - Miss. Barber - 1 episode
1968: The War of Darkie Pilbeam - Jeanette Perrott 
1968: Dad’s Army - Janet king - 5 episodes
1969: Hadleigh - Maggie - 1 episode 
1969-70: Ours Is A Nice House - Vera Parker - 13 episodes 
1970: Husband and Lovers - Christina - 1 episode 
1970: The Mating Machine - Girlfriend - 1 episode
1970 - 1976: Crossroads - Anne Taylor/Powell - Recurring
1971: On the Buses - Sandra
1971: Casanova - Anna - 4 episodes
1972: Mutiny on the Buses - Sandra
1973: General Hospital - Evie Marsh - 1 episode 
1973: Billy Liar - Gloria Honeybell
1973: Murder Must Advertise - Miss Parton
1974: They Disappear When You Lie Down - Linda
1974: Man About the House - Angie - 1 episode 
1975: Comedy Playhouse - Lisa - 1 episode 
1975: My Honourable Mrs - Susan - 3 episodes 
1977: Miss Jones and Son - 1 episode

References 

Croft, David; Perry, Jimmy; Webber, Richard (2000). The Complete A-Z of Dads Army. Orion. 
McCann, Graham (2001) Dad's Army

External links

1945 births
English television actresses
Living people
Actresses from Oldham
20th-century English actresses